Play Murder for Me is a 1990 Argentine-American crime drama film directed by Héctor Olivera. It was the last film in a series of 10 features that Roger Corman coproduced in Argentina in the mid-to-late 1980s. The screenplay was written by José Pablo Feinmann, with additional dialogue credited to Daryl Haney.

Cast
 Jack Wagner ... Paul Slater
 Tracy Scoggins ... Tricia Merritt
 William Paul Burns ... Fred Merritt (como William Burns)
 Ivory Ocean... Lou Venable
 Rodolfo Ranni ... Stanislav Gregorius
 Gerardo Romano ... Alejandro Molina
 Jorge Rivera López ... Victor Silberman
 Francisco Cocuzza ... A.J. Krieger
 Maurice Jouvet ... Patrick
 Manuel Vicente ... Phil Mendoza
 Marcos Woinsky ... Sound & Fury's Manager
 Selva Mayo ... Gregorius' Mistress
 Norma Ibarra ... Concierge
 Alejandra Sylvain ... Dancer
 Ricardo Ibarlin ... Barman
 Araceli González ... Molina's Girlfriend
 Horacio Guisado ... Surgeon
 Diego Borgonovo ... Nurse

References

External links
 
 Play Murder for Me at TCMDB

1990 films
Argentine crime drama films
Films with screenplays by Daryl Haney
Films directed by Héctor Olivera
1990s Argentine films